Porter v Magill [2001] UKHL 67 is a UK administrative law case decided by the House of Lords which arose out of the Homes for votes scandal involving Dame Shirley Porter.

Under English law, the test for establishing bias was set out in Porter v Magill – whether a "fair minded and informed observer", having considered the facts, would conclude that there was a "real possibility" of bias.

Facts
The Conservative majority of Westminster Council adopted a policy to sell council houses in parts of the City where it was believed that home owners were more likely to vote Conservative. It became known as "the homes for votes scandal", involving Shirley Porter. As the leader of Westminster City Council, she helped formulate a policy which appeared to be designed to sell off the council housing at a lower price for the purpose of electoral advantage in marginal wards. The issue was, could the resulting investigation's decision be quashed where an initial press conference appeared to be biased.

Judgment
The House of Lords accepted that councillors are elected. However, their powers can only be used for the purposes for which they are conferred, and not for the electoral advantage of a political party. Also the new (and final) test of bias was introduced:

See also
UK administrative law
Judicial review in English law

Notes

2001 in case law
2001 in London
2001 in British law
2000s in the City of Westminster
United Kingdom administrative case law
Political history of London
House of Lords cases
United Kingdom constitutional case law